Meitner is a multiring impact crater on Venus. This impact crater was named after an Austrian-Swedish physicist, Lise Meitner, in her honour.

References

Impact craters on Venus